"The Stall" is the 76th episode of the NBC sitcom Seinfeld. It is the 12th episode of the fifth season, and first aired on January 6, 1994.

Plot
In a movie theater restroom, Elaine, realizing her stall does not have any toilet paper, asks the woman in the next stall to give her some. The woman refuses, claiming she "can't spare a square." At Elaine's continued pleas, the woman storms out and returns to her seat, and is revealed to be Jerry's girlfriend, Jane. Elaine returns to her seat with her boyfriend Tony. The two women vent about the stall incident to their dates.

Jerry is fed up with Kramer using his phone to call phone sex lines. Elaine tells Jerry about the stall incident. Jerry realizes the woman Elaine was bickering with was Jane and talks his way out of a double date with Elaine and Tony, since Elaine boasts that she will recognize the woman's voice if she hears it again. George idolizes Tony, claiming that "He's such a cool guy" because of his rad and carefree demeanor; Kramer theorizes he is secretly in love with him, leaving George flustered. Jerry thinks that Elaine dates Tony only because he is physically attractive, and that Tony is a "male bimbo", or "mimbo" for short; Elaine constantly denies this fact. 

Elaine calls Jerry on his buzzer to tell him she's coming up, while Jane is there. Jerry disguises Jane's voice by giving her many pieces of gum, muffling her voice to an unrecognizable level. Tony invites George and Kramer to go rock climbing, although George originally planned the trip to be for him and Tony alone. On the rock climbing trip, Tony falls when Kramer and George neglect to secure his rope, leaving Kramer and George stranded halfway up the mountain, screaming in panic. Upon hearing the news, Elaine is worried about the possibility of damage to his face. She pressures Tony (now with a bandaged face) about the injuries, but Tony is unsure. George apologizes to Tony, but Tony says that he does not want to see him anymore and George is left heartbroken. Later, Elaine finally admits to Jerry that she did indeed only care about Tony's looks and refers to him as "[her] mimbo." 

After being introduced to Jane, Kramer privately tells Jerry that he thinks Jane's voice is that of "Erica", one of the girls on the phone sex line that he has been calling. Despite Jane's suspicious vagueness whenever discussing her job, Jerry doesn't believe him. At the coffee shop, Kramer has made a date with Erica to prove that she is Jane. When Jane arrives, she greets Jerry instead of Kramer, but Kramer and Jerry still accuse her. She angrily maintains that she sells paper goods. Elaine hears and recognizes Jane's voice. Jane excuses herself to the bathroom. Elaine runs past her, gathers all the toilet paper in the bathroom, and sits in one of the stalls waiting for Jane to ask for toilet paper. When she does, Elaine vengefully says that she "can't spare a square" and walks out with the toilet paper. Upset over everything, Jane tells Jerry to never call her again; she then says the same - in a lustful voice - to Kramer, revealing that it was indeed her voice on the phone sex line.

Production
Larry Charles got the idea for the toilet paper argument from a Dear Abby letter. Actor Michael Richards said the episode contained one of his biggest regrets from Seinfeld. Immediately after filming, he realized that the rock climbing scene had great potential for physical comedy, which his performance neglected to tap into.

The ending of "The Stall" was cut due to length constraints. The final scene had Elaine and Tony happily rock climbing together, with Tony's face completely healed. However, upon noticing a pimple on Elaine's face, Tony breaks up with her and leaves her stranded halfway up the mountain. The episode as broadcast leaves the Elaine/Tony plot unresolved.

References

External links 
 

Seinfeld (season 5) episodes
1994 American television episodes